Blastobasis glauconotata is a moth in the  family Blastobasidae. It is found in Kenya, where it is known from the central and western highlands and in the central mid-altitudes of the Ngaia Forest.

The length of the forewings is 6.8–9.1 mm. The forewings are greyish brown intermixed with a few pale greyish brown and brown scales. The hindwings are pale greyish brown basally, but gradually darkening towards the apex.

The larvae feed on Afrocarpus falcatus, Chaetacme aristata, Cussonia spicata, Drypetes gerrardii, Elaeodendron buchananii, Ekebergia capensis, Mimusops kummel, Prunus africana, Rawsonia lucida, Schrebera alata, Solanum anguivi, Stychnos mitis, Toddalia asiatica, Vepris nobilis, Vepris simplicifolia, Vepris trichocarpa and Warburgia ugandensis.

Etymology
The species epithet, glauconotata is derived from Latin glauco (meaning grey) and nota (meaning spot) and refers to the dark grey marginal spots on the distal third of the forewing.

References

Endemic moths of Kenya
Moths described in 2010
Blastobasis
Moths of Africa